Vuclip is a mobile video on demand service for emerging markets with more than 7 million subscribers per quarter in countries such as India, Indonesia, Malaysia, Thailand, Egypt and the United Arab Emirates, with rollout plans for other Southeast Asian and African markets. Vuclip brings to subscribers a catalogue of more than 1 million titles, including Bollywood and Hollywood movies, TV shows, sports, news and music videos in 25 different languages, including English, Hindi, Tamil, Telugu, Indonesian, Bahasa, Arabic and Thai.

Vuclip is headquartered in Milpitas, California with a presence in Dubai, Beijing, Kuala Lumpur, Mumbai, Delhi, Jakarta, Bangkok, and Singapore.

The platform can be accessed through Vuclip's Android app as well as through its mobile website [m.vuclip.com].

Overview

Popularity

Like Google, Vuclip started indexing videos on the web. Consumers found Vuclip and started forwarding their videos via SMS messages to their friends. Early adopters started watching and sharing videos, leading to viral dissemination. Carriers like Vodafone and Airtel in India started finding Vuclip on their logs and started promoting it because it led to greater data consumption. Handset manufacturers started preloading the Vuclip launcher on their devices to make themselves more attractive to consumers.

Founders and investors

Vuclip was incorporated as a Milpitas-based mobile video search company by Nickhil Jakatdar (Founder and CEO, Vuclip) and Xinhui Niu in July 2008. The company raised $13 million in Series D, led by a new investor, SingTel Innov8 as the lead investor to further expand into new geographies and innovate on its platform.  Since inception in 2008, Vuclip has attracted more than $40 million in investment from outfits including U.S. venture capital firms New Enterprise Associates and Jafco Ventures and Singapore's SingTel Innov8.

In March 2015, PCCW Media, a Hong Kong-based Media and Entertainment Group acquired a majority stake in the company to enable it to expedite the roll-out of over-the-top (OTT) video services in the Asia Pacific region.

Business developments
Vuclip opened a research and development (R&D) center in Pune, India in February 2015. This is Vuclip's first R&D center in India and its third globally, with the other two located in Silicon Valley and Beijing. The 15,000 square foot center in Pune includes a mobile lab supporting 8,500 different mobile devices from over 200 manufacturers.

Products

Vuclip App on Android, Java, Windows

m.vuclip.com

The mobile site delivers videos on any network and on any device without buffering. The browser-based approach ensures accessibility for consumers in emerging markets where penetration of smart phones is limited.

Vuclip's global mobile video insights
The survey of more than 8,500 users spanning the emerging markets of India, the Middle East, South East Asia and Africa has revealed a growing propensity among mobile video consumers to view and navigate content in their native languages on a single over-the-top mobile app.

Although movies and television shows account for around 80% of the international content consumed on the Vuclip platform, 78 percent of Vuclip viewers in India have shown preference to watching content in their native language.

Thailand(88%) and Indonesia(87%) registered the highest percentage of 'Localized' mobile video content, while Malaysia(64%) registered the lowest among the markets surveyed. Navigation in native languages was considered most important in countries such as Indonesia(89%), Egypt(87%) and Thailand(86%). Respondents in Indonesia (91%), Kenya(90%) and Nigeria(90%) considered in aggregated mobile video platform/app important for accessing international and local content rather than downloading multiple apps.

Acquisitions

In February 2013, Vuclip made its first acquisition; the mobile video company Jigsee, to expand its own premium content inventory and app capabilities in India, one of Vuclip's biggest markets.

Awards and recognition
Mobby's Award for Best New App at the Mobile Digital and Marketing Summit [2013]
Smarties India Award for the publisher/media company of the year [2013]
Impact's Icons of India's Digital Ecosystem.

References

Subscription video on demand services
Companies based in Milpitas, California
Privately held companies based in California